Louis Anthony Cordileone (born August 4, 1937) is a former American football offensive lineman, primarily guard, who in nine years played six seasons in the National Football League, for five different teams. He played college football at Clemson and was drafted in the first round (twelfth overall) of the 1960 NFL Draft..

Cordileone is best known for being traded in 1961 from the New York Giants to the San Francisco 49ers for quarterback Y. A. Tittle. At the time, Tittle was 34 years old and a 4-time Pro Bowler. Cordileone was quoted as reacting "Me, even up for Y. A. Tittle? You're kidding", and later remarked that the Giants traded him for "a 42-year-old quarterback".

His stay in San Francisco was short-lived, as he went to the Rams in 1962, where he played only 2 games, before moving to Pittsburgh, playing 26 games until the end of the 1963 season. After a 3-year hiatus, he joined the expansion team New Orleans Saints for their first two seasons, 1967 and 1968, as offensive guard and defensive tackle. In his last season, he fumbled once, and returned an interception for 7 yards, after having recovered three fumbles in his first two pro seasons.

In 2013 Cordileone starred in the TV Land reality show Forever Young.

References

1937 births
Living people
American football offensive linemen
Clemson Tigers football players
New Orleans Saints players
New York Giants players
Pittsburgh Steelers players
San Francisco 49ers players
Players of American football from Jersey City, New Jersey